Subiza (Basque: Subitza) is a Spanish town located in the province and autonomous community of Navarre, belonging to the municipality of Galar, in northern Spain. Its population in 2014 was of 191 inhabitants (INE).

References

	

Municipalities in Navarre